John John Mnyika is a Tanzanian CHADEMA politician and his party Secretary General. 

He was Member of Parliament for Ubungo constituency from 2010 to 2015 and Kibamba constituency from 2015 to 2020.

References

Living people
Chadema MPs
Tanzanian MPs 2010–2015
Year of birth missing (living people)